Acontia areletta is a moth of the family Noctuidae. The species was first described by Harrison Gray Dyar Jr. in 1907. It is found in Mexico.

The length of the forewings is 12–14 mm for both males and females. Adults are on wing from October to November depending on the location.

References

External links
 

areletta
Moths of Central America
Moths described in 1907